Mohammed Sheriff Yamusah (born March 26, 1978), known by his stage name Doobia Sheriff Ghale, is a Ghana-based international Reggae musician. He won the award for "Reggae Song of the Year" at the 2005 Ghana Music Awards for work from his album Sochira, which means "crossroads" in Dagbani.

Albums
 Sochira
 Nindoo

See also
 Rascalimu
 Black Prophet

References

Living people
Ghanaian musicians
Dagomba people
1978 births
Dagbani-language singers